Court Farmhouse may refer to:
 Court Farmhouse, Llanthony, Monmouthshire, Wales
 Court Farmhouse, Llanover, Monmouthshire, Wales